Route 628 is a  long mostly north–south secondary highway in the eastern portion of New Brunswick, Canada.

The route starts at Route 148 in Taymouth where it travels south along the east bank of the Nashwaak River. The road passes through Durham Bridge, Nashwaak and Manzer. From here, the route travels through Penniac and past Penniac Island before it ends as it crosses the Nashwaak River on a bridge to Route 8.

History
Prior to the opening of the Marysville Bypass in September 2014, this route started at Route 8 before the renumeration.

See also

References

628
628